Pravanjan Madhabnanda Mullick (born 12 September 1976 in Bhubaneswar), is an Indian first class cricketer for Odisha. A right-handed batsman, he captained the side, and has made over 5,000 runs at an average of above 50. He has twice scored a hundred in each innings of a match, the only Odisha player to have done so.

Mullick was a professional for the Northern Irish club Fox Lodge, who are currently in the North West senior one league. He also has played in the Scottish league. He retired from first-class cricket a few seasons back, but still plays for the Katak Tigers in the Odisha Premier League.

External links
 

1976 births
Living people
Odisha cricketers
Indian cricketers
East Zone cricketers
Sportspeople from Bhubaneswar
Cricketers from Odisha
Ferguslie CC players